Highfill is a town in Benton County, Arkansas, United States. The population was 583 at the 2010 census. It is home to the Northwest Arkansas National Airport, which serves all of the Northwest Arkansas region.

Geography
Highfill is located in west-central Benton County at  (36.270483, -94.325093). Arkansas Highway 12 passes through the town, leading northeast to Bentonville and Rogers and west to Gentry. The Northwest Arkansas National Airport occupies the eastern part of town.

Demographics

As of the census of 2010, there were 561 people, 191 households, and 153 families residing in the town.  The population density was 12.9/km2 (33.5/mi2).  There were 165 housing units at an average density of 5.6/km2 (14.6/mi2).  The racial makeup of the town was 92.08% White, 5.28% Native American, 1.06% Asian, 1.32% from other races, and 0.26% from two or more races.  1.06% of the population were Hispanic or Latino of any race.

There were 144 households, out of which 32.6% had children under the age of 18 living with them, 61.1% were married couples living together, 11.8% had a female householder with no husband present, and 22.9% were non-families. 19.4% of all households were made up of individuals, and 6.9% had someone living alone who was 65 years of age or older.  The average household size was 2.63 and the average family size was 2.90.

In the town, the population was spread out, with 26.4% under the age of 18, 8.4% from 18 to 24, 31.4% from 25 to 44, 22.7% from 45 to 64, and 11.1% who were 65 years of age or older.  The median age was 34 years. For every 100 females, there were 100.5 males.  For every 100 females age 18 and over, there were 95.1 males.

The median income for a household in the town was $28,854, and the median income for a family was $30,938. Males had a median income of $21,477 versus $21,705 for females. The per capita income for the town was $12,701.  About 5.3% of families and 18.6% of the population were below the poverty line, including 21.4% of those under age 18 and 29.2% of those age 65 or over.

Education 

Public education is available from these school districts based on resident's location:

 Gentry School District that leads to graduation from Gentry High School.
 Bentonville School District - Zoned schools for this portion of Highfill are: Vaughn Elementary School, Creekside Middle School, Grimsley Junior High School, and Bentonville West High School.
 A small section of Highfill is in the Decatur School District. Decatur High School is that district's comprehensive high school.

References

External links

Towns in Benton County, Arkansas
Towns in Arkansas
Northwest Arkansas